Foskett is a surname. Notable people with the surname include:
Daphne Foskett (1911–1998), English art connoisseur and art writer
Douglas John Foskett, British library and information scientist
Jeff Foskett, guitarist and singer, worked with Brian Wilson and The Beach Boys
Nick Foskett, Vice-Chancellor at Keele University in Staffordshire, England
Reginald Foskett, the fourth Anglican Bishop of Penrith, England in the modern era
Russell Foskett OBE, DFC (1917–1944), Australian flying ace of the Second World War

See also
Fosset (disambiguation)
Fossett